Infidèle is a French television miniseries consisting of six episodes lasting 52 minutes each, created by Didier Le Pêcheur for TF1. It premiered on 6 January 2019 in Belgium at La Une, while in France it premiered on 7 January 2019. It is an adaptation of the 2015 British television series Doctor Foster.

It was successful, each episode had nearly 5.000.000 watchers.

Cast 
 Claire Keim as Emma
 Jonathan Zaccaï as Mattéo
 Félix Lefebvre as Luigi
 Chloé Jouannet as Candice
 Philippe Torreton as Rodolphe
 Natalia Dontcheva as Ingrid
 Sandra Parfait as Linda
 Olivier Claverie as Yves
 Vanessa David as Gwenaëlle
 Mylène Demongeot as Giulia
 Philippe Lefebvre as Nils
 Mathieu Madénian as Castain

References 

2010s French television series
2019 French television series debuts
Doctor Foster
French television series based on British television series
La Une original programming
TF1 television dramas